The 2015 Connacht Senior Football Championship was the 116th instalment of the annual Connacht Senior Football Championship held under the auspices of Connacht GAA. It was one of four provincial competitions in the 2015 All-Ireland Senior Football Championship. Mayo entered the competition as defending Connacht champions and retained the title after a 6-25 to 2-11 win against Sligo in the final on 19 July.
		
The draw to decide the fixtures was made on 10 October 2014. As in previous competitions, the opponents of London and New York in the opening round were decided in advance. The teams that visit the 'Exiles' are chosen on a cyclical basis. As in the 2010 Connacht Championship, Roscommon faced London and Galway faced New York. Mayo and Sligo were drawn straight into the semi-final stage.

Under GAA rules introduced in 2014 to allow counties to more easily predict the dates of their qualifier matches, the two sides of the draw were named as either A or B. London, Roscommon and Sligo were named on the A side of the draw, while Galway, Leitrim, Mayo and New York's draw was named as the B side. New York, as in previous seasons did not compete in the All-Ireland qualifiers.

Note due Covid-19 it would be Galway playing New York and Roscommon for London last games to be held were cancelled in 2020 but will be back in 2025 perhaps.

Teams
The Connacht championship is contested by the five counties in the Irish province of Connacht and the two foreign based teams of London and New York.

Bracket

Fixtures

Preliminary round

Quarter-finals

Semi-finals

Final

See also
 2015 All-Ireland Senior Football Championship
 2015 Leinster Senior Football Championship
 2015 Munster Senior Football Championship
 2015 Ulster Senior Football Championship

References

2C
Connacht Senior Football Championship